The astral body is a syncretic concept in Theosophy and its derivatives, one of four or seven divisions of the Theosophical subtle body.

Astral body may also refer to:

Body of light, a concept in Western esotericism, once synonymous with 'astral body'
Illusory body, a concept in Vajrayana Buddhism, equivalent to 'astral body'
Subtle body, a concept in Eastern esotericism, which includes the 'sheathe' later dubbed 'astral body' by Theosophy

See also
Luminous mind
Okhema
Subtle body (disambiguation)